The Omnibus Trade and Competitiveness Act of 1988 is an act passed by the United States Congress and signed into law by President Ronald Reagan.

History
During the 1970s, the U.S. trade surplus slowly diminished and turned into an increasing deficit. As the deficit increased through the 1980s, some of the blame fell on the tariffs placed on US products by foreign countries, and the lack of similar tariffs on imports into the United States. Workers, unions and industry management all called for government action against countries with an unfair advantage.

The Omnibus Trade and Competitiveness Act started as an amendment proposed by Rep. Dick Gephardt (D-MO) to order the Executive branch to thoroughly examine trade with countries that have large trade surpluses with the United States. If the trade surpluses continued, the offending country would be faced with a bilateral surplus-reduction requirement of 10%. Because of its style of zero-sum game thought, it is considered by economists to be a modern form of mercantilism.

Expiration 
The act was signed into law by President Reagan, slightly less strict than proposed, as the Omnibus Trade and Competitiveness Act of 1988. It expired in 1991 and was not renewed until 1994 by President Bill Clinton. It again expired in 1997 and was renewed once more by Clinton in 1999, and was followed by the Trade Act of 2002.

See also
 Trade Act of 2002
 Currency manipulator
 Exon-Florio Amendment

References

Appleyard, Dennis R, Alfred J Field and Steven L. Cobb. International Economics. McGraw-Hill Irwin, 2006
 Cass, Ronald A. "Velvet Fist in an Iron Glove: The Omnibus Trade and Competitiveness Act of 1988" Regulation, Winter 1991.

External links
 Omnibus Trade and Competitiveness Act of 1988 as amended (PDF/details) in the GPO Statute Compilations collection
 Omnibus Trade and Competitiveness Act of 1988 as enacted (details) in the US Statutes at Large

1988 in law
1988 in the United States
Foreign trade of the United States
United States federal taxation legislation
United States federal trade legislation
1988 in international relations